The J. R. Willis House and La Miradora Apartments, also known as Casa de Suenos Old Town Country Inn, are a historic Spanish-Pueblo Revival style home and apartment complex in Albuquerque, New Mexico. The home and studio were built by H. W. Balay for Artist J. R. Willis in 1938.  The adjacent apartments were constructed between 1938 and 1954.  J. R. Willis was a photographer and artist, best known for his Indian photographs and paintings and Southwestern landscapes.  J. R. Willis lived and worked in the home and studio through his death in December, 1960.  The home, studio and apartments were listed on the National Register of Historic Places in 2005.

The most distinguishing feature of the property is the Hanna Studio Addition, the so-called "Snail House". This addition bridges the open space between the Willis House and studio. Completed in 1978, well after the period of significance and is not part of the historic designation.

References

National Register of Historic Places in Albuquerque, New Mexico
Residential buildings on the National Register of Historic Places in New Mexico
Residential buildings completed in 1938
1938 establishments in New Mexico
New Mexico State Register of Cultural Properties